Esther and Mordecai is a 1685 oil on panel painting by Arent de Gelder, a pupil of Rembrandt. It is now in the Museum of Fine Arts, in Budapest.

References

1680s paintings
Dutch Golden Age paintings
Paintings in the collection of the Museum of Fine Arts (Budapest)
Paintings of Esther